Faye Dunaway is an American actress who has been honored with numerous accolades. Among them, she has won an Academy Award, three Golden Globes, a BAFTA, an Emmy, two David di Donatello, and was the first-ever recipient of a Leopard Club Award, which honors film professionals whose work has left a mark on the collective imagination. In 1996, Dunaway received a Star on the Hollywood Walk of Fame. In 2011, the government of France made her an Officer of the Order of Arts and Letters.

Major associations

Academy Awards
The Academy Awards (or "the Oscars") are a set of awards given annually for excellence of cinematic achievements. The awards, organized by the Academy of Motion Picture Arts and Sciences (AMPAS), were first held in 1929. Dunaway has received three nominations in the Academy Award for Best Actress category, and has won one.

BAFTA Awards
The BAFTA Award is an annual award show presented by the British Academy of Film and Television Arts to award the best in film. The awards were founded in 1947 as The British Film Academy. Dunaway has received three nominations, and won one, in the Most Promising Newcomer to Leading Film Roles category.

Emmy Awards (Primetime)
The Primetime Emmy Award is an American accolade bestowed by the Academy of Television Arts & Sciences in recognition of excellence in U. S. prime time television programming. First given in 1949, the award was originally referred to as simply the Emmy Awards or Emmy. Dunaway has won one.

Golden Globe Awards
The Golden Globe Award is an accolade bestowed by the 93 members of the Hollywood Foreign Press Association (HFPA) recognizing excellence in film and television, both domestic and foreign. Dunaway has received eleven nominations, and won three - one in the Best Actress – Motion Picture Drama category, and two from the Best Supporting Actress – Series, Miniseries, or Television Film category.

Screen Actors Guild Awards
The Screen Actors Guild Awards are accolades given by the Screen Actors Guild‐American Federation of Television and Radio Artists (SAG-AFTRA) to recognize outstanding performances in film and prime time television.

Film critics awards

Festival awards

Other awards and nominations

CableACE Awards

David di Donatello Awards

Gemini Awards

Hasty Pudding Theatricals

Laurel Awards

Satellite Awards

Walk of Fame

External links
 

Dunaway, Faye